This article lists the administrators of Allied-occupied Germany, which represented the Allies of World War II in Allied-occupied Germany from the end of World War II in Europe in 1945 until the establishment of West Germany, officially the Federal Republic of Germany (FRG) and East Germany, officially the German Democratic Republic (GDR;) in 1949.

Officeholders 
Source:

American zone 

Military governors

High Commissioners

British zone 

Military governors

High Commissioners

French zone 

Military commander

Military governor

High Commissioner

Soviet zone 

Military commanders

Chief Administrators of the Soviet Military Administration

Chairman of the Soviet Control Commission

High Commissioners

See also 
 History of Germany (1945–1990)
 History of Berlin#West and East Germany (1945–1990)
 List of commandants of Berlin Sectors

Notes

References 

Administrators Of Allied-Occupied Germany
administrators of Allied-occupied
Allied-occupied Germany, Administrators
Administrators Of Allied-Occupied Germany
Allied-occupied Germany, Administrators